The Brame House, also known as the Brame-Cody-Neal House, was a historic Classical Revival-style house in  Montgomery, Alabama.  The two-story frame house was built in 1897 by W.W. Brame.  It was added to the Alabama Register of Landmarks and Heritage on January 29, 1980, and to the National Register of Historic Places on September 17, 1980.  The house was demolished in 1990, after some attempts were made to save it.

See also
National Register of Historic Places listings in Montgomery County, Alabama
Properties on the Alabama Register of Landmarks and Heritage in Montgomery County, Alabama

References

Houses on the National Register of Historic Places in Alabama
Houses completed in 1897
Neoclassical architecture in Alabama
National Register of Historic Places in Montgomery, Alabama
Properties on the Alabama Register of Landmarks and Heritage
Houses in Montgomery, Alabama
Demolished buildings and structures in Alabama
Buildings and structures demolished in 1990